A maypole is a tall wooden pole.

Maypole may also refer to:

People
 George M. Maypole (1883-1956), American politician

Places
 Maypole, Birmingham, England
 Maypole, Isles of Scilly, Cornwall, England
 Maypole, Bromley, a district in the London Borough of Bromley
 Maypole, Canterbury, Kent, England, near Hoath
 Maypole, Dartford, Kent, England, within the Greater London Built-up Area
 Maypole, Monmouthshire, Wales, a place in Monmouthshire

Other uses
 Maypole framework, a computer web development framework
 Maypole Dairy Company, an early chain of British dairies